Mario Vucenovic (born 6 October 1999) is an Austrian footballer who plays as a left winger for Wiener Sport-Club in the Austrian Regionalliga East.

Career

Club career
Mario started his career at ASK Wilhelmsburg as a youth player, alongside his older brother, Aleksandar Vucenovic. The two brother's then together moved SKN St. Pölten in 2012. Mario played for the clubs academy until 2017, where he got his debut for the clubs reserve team in the Austrian Regionalliga in August 2017. He made 12 appearances in the Regionalliga during the season.

In the summer 2018, Vucenovic moved to Austrian Football Second League club SV Horn. With only 190 minutes of playing time spread over 8 matches at Horn, 19-year old Vucenovic moved to fellow league club SKU Amstetten on 28 August 2019, signing a deal until the end of the season. However, he was barely used here as well, playing only 53 minutes before leaving at the end of the year. Vucenovic then returned to SKN St. Pölten in January 2020, where he began playing for the clubs reserve team in the 1. Niederösterreichische Landesliga. In the summer 2021, Vucenovic was promoted to St. Pölten's first team squad in the 2. Liga.

In January 2022, Vucenovic moved to Austrian Regionalliga East club Wiener Sport-Club.

References

External links
 
 Mario Vucenovic at ÖFB

Living people
1999 births
Association football wingers
Austrian footballers
2. Liga (Austria) players
Austrian Regionalliga players
SKN St. Pölten players
SV Horn players
SKU Amstetten players
Wiener Sport-Club players
People from Sankt Pölten
Footballers from Lower Austria